William Thomas Daniel Hanson (born 21 April 1982) is an English cricketer.  Hanson is a right-handed batsman who fields as a wicket-keeper.  He was born in Leicester, Leicestershire.

While studying for his degree at Durham University, Hanson made his first-class debut for Durham UCCE against Nottinghamshire in 2003.  He made two further first-class appearance in 2003, against Durham and Lancashire.  In his three first-class matches, he scored 13 runs at an average of 6.50, with a high score of 9 not out.  Behind the stumps he took 5 catches and made a single stumping.

In 2006, he made his debut for Devon in the 2006 MCCA Knockout Trophy against Wales Minor Counties.  The following year he made a further appearance for Devon in that competition against Berkshire, which was his final appearance for Devon.

He is currently a sports and cricket coach at St Paul's School, London.

References

External links
William Hanson at ESPNcricinfo
William Hanson at CricketArchive

1982 births
Living people
Cricketers from Leicester
Alumni of Durham University
English cricketers
Durham MCCU cricketers
Devon cricketers
Wicket-keepers